Sharon Pincott is an Australian author and specialist in African elephant behaviour. She has studied the social structure and population dynamics of a single clan of wild elephants extensively, and advocates for ending ivory trade and promoting conservation.

Background 
Pincott grew up in the small town of Grantham, Queensland in the Lockyer Valley Region in Australia's east. She originally worked in the field of Information Technology (IT) and progressed to the position of National Director of IT for Ernst & Young Australia based in Sydney.

Zimbabwe-focused work
Pincott worked alone, on a full-time voluntary basis, for 13 years (2001–2014) with the clan of wild, free-roaming, elephants known as the Presidential Elephants of Zimbabwe on land bordering the Main Camp entrance to Hwange National Park. She acquired a reputation for being able to "talk to the elephants".

In 2009, eight years after arriving in Zimbabwe, Pincott was appointed South Africa Getaway magazine's 'Elephant Ambassador in Africa' "in recognition of her courageous work with wildlife in Hwange". Pincott subsequently came to the attention of Natural History Unit Africa and became the subject of the documentary titled All the President's Elephants.

This All the President's Elephants documentary was filmed with Pincott in Hwange in 2011. It is the story of Pincott's life, work and intimate relationship with the Presidential Elephants of Zimbabwe, showcasing these Hwange elephants and some of the problems they face. It includes her wire snare removal work with colleagues called in to dart injured elephants using a tranquillizer gun. It also features Pincott's work successfully recommending and encouraging President Robert Mugabe to reaffirm his commitment to this clan of elephants, in an effort to secure their future.

From December 2017 Pincott was active in voicing widespread opposition to scores more young elephants being captured, forcibly taken from their mothers and families inside Hwange National Park and transported to Chinese zoos, appealing to Zimbabwe's new President Emmerson Mnangagwa for an immediate review of policy and ultimately delivering a petition that attracted 287,509 signatures.

Her elephant conservation work has been profiled in National Geographic, BBC Wildlife and Africa Geographic. She has been interviewed by writers for Intrepid Explorer magazine, South Africa The Zimbabwean newspaper, The Sydney Morning Herald, and Travel Africa magazine.

Author
She has published three books: The Elephants and I (Jacana Media, South Africa 2009), Battle for the President's Elephants (Jacana Media, South Africa 2012) and Elephant Dawn (first published by Allen & Unwin, Australia 2016, and then by Jacana Media, South Africa 2016). She is also the author of two earlier elephant works self-published in Zimbabwe, In An Elephant's Rumble (2004) and A Year Less Ordinary (2006).

Ivory trade
For World Wildlife Day 2017 Pincott collaborated with the International Fund for Animal Welfare in an attempt to help bring an end to the Ivory trade. On International Women's Day 2017 Pincott was acknowledged by associates of the Wildlife Preservation Society of Queensland, Australia, as "blazing a trail for elephants as well as women working in conservation". In late March 2017, almost 3 years after leaving her Hwange elephant work, Pincott was still being acknowledged by the Zimbabwe press for her "profound dedication to the Presidential Elephants", in a country increasingly known for hostility towards conservationists who speak out against wildlife-related corruption. In May 2017, after a male big-game hunter was crushed to death in Hwange when an adult female elephant, felled by gunfire, landed on him, Pincott reasoned in an interview that it was "likely" to be a known Presidential Elephant female that was shot in this hunting party incident, and highlighted the ongoing ineffectuality of Mugabe's Presidential Decree.

Health  

In 2017 Pincott revealed that she was suffering from rare, incurable, autoimmune connective tissue disease believed by medical researchers to be both environment- and stress-related.

References

External links 
 

Non-fiction environmental writers
21st-century Australian writers
Australian memoirists
Australian nature writers
Australian conservationists
Australian naturalists
People from Queensland
1962 births
Living people
Elephant conservation
People associated with animal welfare and rights
Writers about Africa
2011 in Zimbabwe
2012 in Zimbabwe
2014 in Zimbabwe
21st-century memoirists